John Angelos was a senior official of the Empire of Nicaea. Of low birth, he was one of the favourites of Emperor Theodore II Laskaris (r. 1254–58), who promoted him to the rank of prōtostratōr in 1255, from the rank of megas primikērios. He died soon after Theodore's death, possibly committing suicide when the nobles under Michael Palaiologos took power.

References

Sources
 
 

1258 deaths
13th-century Byzantine people
People of the Empire of Nicaea
Protostratores
Year of birth unknown
Medieval suicides